The Eddy Block is a historic commercial building in Webster, Massachusetts.  The three-story brick building was built by Lyman R. Eddy in 1878 on the site of a previous block which had been destroyed by fire.  The Gothic Revival building has had a variety of tenants, including the post office, a district court, the Masonic Lodge (the latter two in the upper floor meeting space), and the Webster Times.

The building was listed on the National Register of Historic Places in 1980.

See also
National Register of Historic Places listings in Worcester County, Massachusetts

References

Commercial blocks on the National Register of Historic Places in Massachusetts
Commercial buildings completed in 1878
Buildings and structures in Webster, Massachusetts
National Register of Historic Places in Worcester County, Massachusetts
Gothic Revival architecture in Massachusetts